Chai Nat (from Sanskrit Jayanāda जयनाद, "resounding of victory") can refer to:

 Chai Nat Province, a province in Central Thailand
 Chai Nat, a town in Chai Nat Province
 Mueang Chai Nat District, the main district of Chai Nat Province
 Rangsit Prayurasakdi, also known as Prince of Chai Nat
 Chai Nat (city), an ancient city in present-day Phitsanulok Province